The Daniel J. Donahoe House is a historic residence in Ponca City, Oklahoma. It is listed on the National Register of Historic Places. The house was designed by Solomon Layton and constructed by O.F. Keck in 1910.

It was deemed a "fine example" of Craftsman architecture.

References

National Register of Historic Places in Kay County, Oklahoma
Houses completed in 1910
Houses on the National Register of Historic Places in Oklahoma